Viscofan is a Spanish manufacturer of casings for meat products (also known as artificial casings given their capacity to replace animal casings that are used in the production of cold meats), with commercial presence in over 100 countries around the world.

It is the only world producer with the capacity to manufacture the four main technologies available on the casings or artificial casings market (cellulose, collagen, fibrous and plastic).

Its complex production process is based on the physical and chemical treatment of the raw materials, which, through mechanical or physical-chemical rupture and later homogenizations and mixes, become a mass that can be extruded in the production process.

The extrusion operation is performed by pressing the mass, either through a ring (to produce a tubular casing) or through a slot (for example to produce a plastic film or collagen sheet). This way, smooth casing is produced that can later be rolled onto spools or rolls and that can undergo a series of transformation processes (this process is also called "converting"), among which particularly noteworthy is the tripe pleating (i.e. its folds) and occasionally its printing and closure; all to facilitate its storage and later distribution in the form of sticks, so that clients can use them easily in their cold meat production machinery.

The company has been trading in the Madrid Stock Exchange General Index since December 1986 and currently forms part of the IBEX 35.

History 
Viscofan was founded in 1975, the year in which the production and commercialisation of its products began. The company's solid growth led it to taking the next natural step into starting its share trading in the Madrid Stock Exchange General Index in December 1986.

As part of its growth strategy, in 1988 Viscofan acquired the food group IAN (Industrias Alimentarias de Navarra), which enabled it to gain momentum in the industry on a national level.

Following this, the company designed an international expansion strategy which began with the acquisition of the German company Naturin GmbH&Co in 1990 and with the opening of new commercial offices in other countries.

In 1995 it acquired Gamex in the Czech Republic and Trificiel in Sao Paulo (Brazil). Its expansion continued, and in 2005 it acquired Koteksprodukt AD in Serbia and the assets of AB Tripasin of Sweden.  A year later, in 2006, Viscofan strengthened its presence in the American market with the purchase of the American assets of Teepak (US and Mexico).

In 2008 the company executed the expansion of its co-generation plant in Spain. In the same year, Viscofan Bioengineering (VBE) was constituted as a business unit that combines biosciences and engineering to supply collagen-based products which can be applied to repair damaged tissues in patients. The Viscofan Group's Bioengineering unit is located in Weinheim (Germany), a benchmark centre for the company's collagen casings, where it has an additional cleanroom to produce collagen products for medical use.

In 2009 a new milestone was reached within the company's international expansion strategy, with the creation of Viscofan Technology (Suzhou) Co. Ltd. in China. Viscofan already distributed its products in the Asian country prior to this but it did not have its own production centre. A year later, in 2010, the first converting plant in the country was inaugurated.

Particularly outstanding in 2012 was the creation of Viscofan Uruguay S.A., converting collagen for the first time in Latin America.

In 2013, in its drive into the Asian market, the collagen extrusion plant was opened in China. A year later, in 2014, the Company opened the extrusion plant in Uruguay.

In 2015, coinciding with the celebration of its 40th anniversary, Viscofan sold the IAN Group to focus all of its efforts on the casing business, with the acquisition of Nanopack Technology & Packaging in order to give a new boost to the plastics business line. Also in 2015, the company inaugurated its new plastics plant in Mexico.

In 2016 Viscofan strengthened its positioning and improved its product offer with the acquisition of Vector USA and Vector Europe.

Production lines 
Viscofan produces the four kinds of artificial casing available on the market: 
 Cellulose casings: this variety uses natural cellulose as its raw material. It is mainly used to produce traditionally cooked Sausages. In most cases, the casing acts merely as a cooking mould, and is generally peeled off by the manufacturer before sale to end consumers. Viscofan holds around 50% of the global market share of this product.  
 Collagen casings: these casings use collagen as their raw material, a protein that is extracted from cattle and pig hides. This is an alternative to natural casings for the production of fresh and processed sausages. Collagen offers high resistance because it can be used for quick stuffing, hanging and oven cooking. Viscofan holds around a third of the global market share of this variety. 
 Fibrous casings: these are made with a mix of cellulose and Manila hemp, a plant-based paper that gives the casing high strength and a uniform calibre. It is mainly used for high-calibre and sliced meats such as mortadella or Pepperonis. Viscofan is among the 3 top producers in the world of this technology. 
 Plastic casings: this kind of casing uses different plastic polymers as its raw material, which are mainly used for cooked products such as Hams, mortadella and Cheeses. Viscofan also has plastic products for packaging, such as the shrink bags for fresh or frozen meats and plastic films to separate sliced foods. Viscofan is among the 5 top world producers in this technology.

International presence 
Viscofan exports a large part of its products to other markets and is currently present in over 100 countries. Thanks to its internationalization strategy, it has production centres in 10 countries – Spain, Germany, Belgium, Czech Republic, Serbia, China, United States, Brazil, Mexico and Uruguay – and has commercial offices in 15 countries.

References

Bibliography 
 Guillén, Mauro F.; García-Cana, Esteban (2010).

External links 
 Official website of Viscofan

Food and drink companies of Spain
Food and drink companies established in 1975
Multinational companies headquartered in Spain
1975 establishments in Spain
IBEX 35